Arab socialism is a political ideology based on the combination of pan-Arabism and socialism. Arab socialism is distinct from the much broader tradition of socialist thought in the Arab world, which predates Arab socialism by as much as fifty years. The term "Arab socialism" was coined by Michel Aflaq, the principal founder of Ba'athism and the Arab Socialist Ba'ath Party in Syria, in order to distinguish his version of socialist ideology from the international socialist movement.

Original meaning
Socialism was a major component of Ba'athist thought, and it featured in the party's tripartite slogan of "unity, liberty, socialism". However, in using the term "Arab socialism," Aflaq was not referring to the internationalist strain of socialism; his conception resolved socialism with Arab nationalism. In a written statement from 1946, Aflaq wrote "The Arab nationalists are socialists", hence "there is neither incompatibility nor contradiction nor war between nationalists and socialists." Socialism in his mind was subservient to the Arab unity project and liberty, however, he did believe that fighting for Arab liberation and unity was the same as fighting for socialism, believing they were two sides of the same coin, The goal of the Arab liberation struggle was to fight imperialism, opposing the ruling classes and to fight for social justice. He further noted that "the social economic question is the issue of prime importance in our life, but it is directly related to the wider issue of nationalism" and "we want socialism to serve our nationalism."

The socialism envisaged in the party's constitution of 1947 and in later writings up to the establishment of the United Arab Republic, is moderate and shows little, if any signs of Marxism. In the party's 1947 constitution it reads "socialism is a necessity which emanates from the depths of Arab nationalism .... Socialism constitutes the ideal social order [for] the Arab people." The Ba'ath Party was founded in 1947 as the Arab Ba'ath Party, it became the Arab Socialist Ba'ath Party in 1952 when it merged with the Arab Socialist Party. Later, in 1950, Aflaq defined socialism as "not an aim in itself, but rather a necessary means to guarantee society the highest standard of production with the farthest limit of cooperation and solidarity among the citizens ... Arab society ... needs a social order with deeper foundations, wider horizons, and more forceful realization than moderate British socialism." A Soviet analyst on the subject of the Ba'athist movement noted "The concept of socialist structure [as it] appeared in the articles and speeches ... [in] the period of the birth of the new movement [the Ba'ath] ... was just a hazy outline on a barely developed ideological negative."

The party constitution of 1947 called for a "just redistribution of wealth", state ownership of public utilities, natural resources, large industry, and transport, state control over foreign and domestic trade, limiting the agricultural holdings of owners to the amount the owner could cultivate, an economy under some sort of state supervision, workers' participation in management and profit sharing, respected inheritance and the rights of private property. Prominent in Ba'athist writings from the 1940s and the 1950s, was the concern of exploitation of one group of citizens by another. The party forbade exploitation in its constitution. It further called for the abolition of class and class differences in the future envisaged society. In 1955 Aflaq defined socialism as "the sharing of the resources of the country by its citizens."

While Aflaq always found it easier to define socialism as what it was not, one thing he and Salah al-Din al-Bitar were certain of, was that Arab socialism was not communist or related in any way to communism. Part of the reason for this was the French Communist Party's support for lengthening the French Mandate of Syria. In a published shortly after that decision was made, Aflaq wrote "If I am asked to define socialism, I shall not look for it in the works of [Karl] Marx and [Vladimir] Lenin." The main cardinal difference between Arab socialism and communism, according to Aflaq and Ba'athist in general, was the cardinal role given to nationalism. Since everything in Ba'athist thought was somehow linked to Arab nationalism, Aflaq could not bridge the gap between nationalism and communist internationalism. However, he did note Josip Broz Tito's policy of self-determination while governing Yugoslavia. Another difference was that Aflaq did not support the communist idea that class struggle was the central piece throughout human history, given that role instead to nationalism.

Radicalization of the term
However, in the 1950s, changing attitudes of socialism within the Ba'ath Party began to be apparent. Jamal al-Atassi, in a writing dating to 1956, wrote that while Arab socialism was not communism, the party could learn from the experience of the socialist countries of how to construct a socialist society. It was around this time communist-inspired terms such as "masses of the people" and "people's organization" began to be heavily used in Ba'athist literature, while at the same time emphasizing class conflict more than before. He wrote that "Socialism cannot realize its goals unless it starts from the [fact of] division, difference, and conflict among society's structures and classes." Atassi ended the article by calling for the "oppressed classes" of the workers, peasants and "other strugglers" to join in the effort to overthrow the oppressors to establish a united Arab society. In short, he called for revolutionary struggle. While Aflaq did believe class conflict existed, he believed it to be subordinate to nationalism.

Munif al-Razzaz, a Jordanian Ba'athist, wrote the Ba'athist classic "Why Socialism Now?" in 1957. In it he takes a "very different" approach on interpreting the meaning of socialism from Aflaq. As he wrote, "Socialism is a way of life, not just an economic order. It extends to all aspects of life—economics, politics, training, education, social life, health, morals, literature, science, history, and others, both great and small." In contrast to official party writings which stressed Arab unity above else, Razzaz tried to demonstrate the interdependent nature of unity, liberty and socialism. He criticized the view that socialism had to come after Arab unity, stating "Socialism, freedom and unity are not different names for different things, ... but different facets of one basic law from which they spring." He further noted that "If I believe in man and in man's worth, then I should believe in unity, nationalism, freedom, and socialism because each of them represents a facet of man's fundamental value." Razzaz ended the article, stating that socialism had been achieved to the same degree as "freedom and unity have been achieved."

External reception
The website of the Arab Socialist Ba'ath Party has an entry dated 1 January 2011, stating: "In 28/10/2003, by the attendance of comrade Al-Ahmar and Mr. Ching, the Arab Socialist Ba'ath Party and the Chinese Communist Party agreed to sign an agreement at the end of the discussions for three years, 2004/2005/2006. The two parties wish to promote and enhance the relations of friendship and cooperation between their two parties and co-ordinate their efforts for embodying their common objectives for the wellbeing of their two friendly peoples".

On the other hand, the Arabist Bernard Lewis has stated: "Nobody seems to have a good word to say for Arab socialism. Commercial, professional, and middle class elements bring against it the usual complaints which are brought against socialism in Western countries. Left-wingers dismiss Arab socialism with contempt as a half-hearted and inefficient compromise which has the merits neither of socialism nor of capitalism."

See also
African socialism
Socialism with Chinese characteristics
Arab nationalism
Ba'athism
Islamic socialism
Nasserism
Pan-Arabism
Third International Theory

References

Bibliography

External links
Nasser and Arab Socialism

 
Socialism
Types of socialism